The Big Number or The Big Act (German: Die große Nummer) is a 1943 German drama film directed by Karl Anton and starring Leny Marenbach, Maly Delschaft and Paul Hoffmann. A circus film, it was originally intended to star Harry Piel but due to delays on Panic he withdrew from the project, although he had contributed to the screenplay. Location shooting took place at the Circus Sarrasani in Dresden. The film's sets were designed by the art director Willy Schiller. It was one of three entertainment-focused films playing in Berlin at the time of the Sportpalast speech by Joseph Goebbels calling for total war.

Cast
 Leny Marenbach as Helga Wallner
 Maly Delschaft as 	Marion Wallner
 Paul Hoffmann as 	Heinrich Wallner
 Rudolf Prack as 	Peter Stoll
 Paul Kemp as Otto Gellert
 Charlott Daudert as 	Mariettchen
 Marina Ried as 	Bianca
 Karl Günther as Direktor Kroll
 Maria Horstweg as 	Frau Roselli
 Walter Janssen as 	Zeller
 Heinz Klingenberg as 	Dr. Buchner
 Rose Rauch as Singer
 Hans Adalbert Schlettow as 	Basto-Bastelmeyer

References

Bibliography 
 Echternkamp, Jörg. Germany and the Second World War Volume IX/II: German Wartime Society 1939-1945: Exploitation, Interpretations. OUP, 2014.
 Skopal, Pavel & Winkel, Roel Vande (ed.) Film Professionals in Nazi-Occupied Europe: Mediation Between the National-Socialist Cultural “New Order” and Local Structures. Springer Nature, 2021.

External links 
 

1943 films
Films of Nazi Germany
German drama films
1943 drama films
1940s German-language films
Tobis Film films
Circus films
Films directed by Karl Anton
1940s German films